Jan Ruml (born 5 March 1953 in Prague) is a Czech politician who was interior minister from 1992 to 1997.

Government career
Before becoming Interior Minister, Jan Ruml served as deputy Interior Minister in 1991.

Jan Ruml announced his resignation as Interior Minister on 21 October 1997. He then challenged Václav Klaus for the leadership of the Civic Democratic Party over a party funding scandal. However Klaus won with 72% of the vote at a party conference on the 14 December 1997.

Freedom Union
Jan Ruml became leader of a breakaway party called Freedom Union, which was founded on the 17 January 1998. He led the party into the 1998 election, where the party won 8.6% of the vote and 19 seats and went into opposition.

Jan Ruml announced his resignation as leader of the Freedom Union on the 1 December 1999.

References

Living people
1953 births
Politicians from Prague
Interior ministers of the Czech Republic
Members of the Chamber of Deputies of the Czech Republic (1996–1998)
Charter 77 signatories
Czech human rights activists
Czech democracy activists
Civic Democratic Party (Czech Republic) MPs
Freedom Union – Democratic Union MPs
Civic Forum politicians
Civic Democratic Party (Czech Republic) Government ministers
Freedom Union – Democratic Union Senators
Green Party (Czech Republic) politicians
Leaders of the Freedom Union – Democratic Union
University of West Bohemia alumni